Afognak Forest and Fish Culture was established by the General Land Office in Alaska on December 24, 1892, as a forest preserve.  It covered  in 1905, when the forest reserves were transferred to the U.S. Forest Service. On July 1, 1908, the entire forest was combined with Chugach National Forest and the name was discontinued.

References

External links
 Forest History Society
 Listing of the National Forests of the United States and Their Dates (from Forest History Society website) Text from Davis, Richard C., ed. Encyclopedia of American Forest and Conservation History. New York: Macmillan Publishing Company for the Forest History Society, 1983. Vol. II, pp. 743-788.

Former National Forests of the United States